Golinci is a village in Eastern Croatia.

Populated places in Osijek-Baranja County